The Roman Catholic Archdiocese of Bombay comprises eleven Deaneries consisting of 121 member parishes spread over the Mumbai Metropolitan Region.

South Mumbai Deanery

 Byculla: Our Lady of Glory
 Cavel: Our Lady of Health
 Colaba: St.Joseph
 Cumballa Hill: St.Stephen
 Dabul: St. Francis Xavier
 Fort: Holy Name Cathedral
 Fort: St.John the Evangelist
 Girgaum: St.Teresa
 Mandvi: St.Ignatius
 Mazagaon: Our Lady of the Rosary
 Mazagaon: St. Anne
 Sonapur: Our Lady of Dolours
 Umerkhadi: St.Joseph

North Mumbai Deanery

 Dadar East: St.Paul Church
 Dadar West: Our Lady of Salvation
 Dharavi: St.Anthony Church
 Jacob Circle: St. Ignatius Church
 Lower Parel: Holy Cross Church
 Mahim: Our Lady of Victories
 Mahim: St. Michael
 Sewri: Our Lady of Fatima Church
 Sion: Church of Our Lady of Good Counsel & Shrine of St. Anthony, Sion
 Malad: Our Lady of Lourdes Church
 Wadala East: St. Dominic Savio Church
 Wadala West: Our Lady of Dolours
 Worli: Sacred Heart Church

Bandra Deanery
 Bandra East: St.Joseph the Worker
 Bandra West: Mount Carmel
 Bandra West: St. Andrew
 Bandra West: St. Anne
 Bandra West: St. Francis of Assisi
 Bandra West: St.Peter
 Bandra West: St. Theresa
 Khar: St. Vincent de Paul

Central Suburbs Deanery
Irla: Our Lady of Velankanni
 Juhu: St.Joseph
 Juhu-Tara:Holy Cross
 Kalina: Our Lady of Egypt
 Santa Cruz: Sacred Heart Church
 Vakola: St. Anthony 
 Vile Parle: St. Francis Xavier

Kurla Deanery

 Kurla: Holy Cross
 Kurla: St.Joseph
 Kurla: St.Jude, Jari-Mari
 Chembur East: Our Lady of Perpetual Succour, Diamond Garden
 Chembur East: St.Sebastian, Marouli
 Chembur West: Holy Family Church, Pestom Sagar
 Trombay: Our Lady of Velankanni, Cheetah Camp (Tamil Parish)
 Ghatkopar East: Infant Jesus
 Kirol: Our Lady of Fatima
 Mankhurd: St. Anthony
 Saki Naka: St.Anthony
 Govandi: Christ the King, Shivaji Nagar

Andheri Deanery
 Andheri East: Holy Family
 Andheri East: Sacred Heart
 Andheri East: St.John the Evangelist, Marol
 Andheri East: St. Vincent Pallotti, Marol
 Andheri East: Our Lady of Health, Sahar
 Andheri West: Our Lady of Health, Versova
 Andheri West: Good Shepherd
 Andheri West: St. Blaise, Amboli
 Jogeshwari East: Infant Jesus
 Jogeshwari West: Christ the King

Borivali Deanery

 Borivli East: Christ the King
 Borivli West: Our Lady of the Immaculate Conception
 Borivli West: St.John Bosco
 Dahisar: St.Louis
 Goregaon East: St.Joseph
 Goregaon East: St. Thomas
 Goregaon West: Our Lady of the Rosary
 Kandivli East: Nativity of Our Lord
 Kandivli West: Our Lady of the Assumption
 Kandivali West: Our Lady of Remedy, Poinsur
 Malad : Our Lady of the Sea, Madh
 Malad East: St.Jude
 Malad West: Our Lady of Lourdes
 Malad : St. Anthony, Malwani
 Malad : Our Lady of the Forsaken, Malwani Colony

Bhayandar Deanery
 Bhayandar East: Divine Mercy
 Bhayandar West: Our Lady of Nazareth
 Chowk: St. Andrew
 Dongri: Our Lady of Bethlehem
 Dongri - Irmitri: Our Lady of Fátima
 Gorai: Holy Magi
 Kashimira: St.Jerome
 Manori: Our Lady of Perpetual Succour
 Mira Road: St.Joseph
 Uttan: Our Lady of the Sea
 Uttan-Pali: Our Lady of Lourdes

Thane Deanery
 Thane: St.John the Baptist
 Thane: Our Lady of Mercy, Pokhran 
 Thane: St.Lawrence, Wagle Estate
 Thane: Our Lady of Fatima, Majiwada
 Mulund: St.Pius the Tenth 
 Bhandup : St. Anthony, Tembipada
 Vikhroli: St.Joseph
 Vikhroli: St. Francis Xavier, Parksite 
 Kanjur:  St. Francis Xavier
 Powai: Most Holy Trinity
 Ambernath: Our Lady of Fatima
 Badlapur: St. Francis Xavier
 Dombivli: Infant Jesus
 Kalwa: St. Anthony of Padua
 Kalyan: Our Lady of Lourdes
 Mumbra: St.Joseph the Worker

Navi Mumbai Deanery
 Airoli: St. Theresa of the Child Jesus
 CBD Belapur: St.Joseph
 Ghansoli: Our Lady of the Forsaken
 Kalamboli: Holy Spirit
 Kharghar: Divya Kripa
 Koparkhairane: St. Francis de Sales
 Nerul: Our Lady of the Visitation
 Panvel: St. Francis Xavier
 Rasayani: Christ the King
 Sanpada: Good Shepherd
 Uran: Our Lady of the Purification
 Vashi: Sacred Heart

Raigad Deanery
 Alibag: Mary of Nazareth
 Karjat: Our Lady of Fatima
 Khopoli: Holy Redeemer
 Korlai: Our Lady of Mt.Carmel
 Mahad: St. Francis Xavier
 Roha: Sacred Heart

Roman Catholic churches in Mumbai
Churches in Maharashtra
Christianity in Maharashtra
Mumbai-related lists
India religion-related lists